OBS Gyeongin TV is a South Korean free-to-air television station covering Gyeonggi Province, Incheon and Seoul. It is the only regional television network in operation, that is not affiliated with any national broadcast network.

History
At the time of launch, OBS Gyeongin TV Ltd. was owned by the following companies:
 Young-An Hat Company (22.64%)
 Media Will (12.43%)
 KD Group (12.30%)

Officially, "OBS" does not stand for anything. However, as the channel's first president  explained, the "O" could mean "One", "Our", "Open", "Oasis" and "Opportunity".

Gallery

References

Further reading 
 (Korean) (August 1, 2011)  . Accessed September 2011.
 (Korean) (March 21, 2011) "Seoulseo see Kyung-TV ... KCC, offshore permit retransmission." Asia Economy. Accessed September 2011.
 (Korean) (May 20, 2010) "Times-OBS Kyung-business agreement." Kyung-Times. Accessed September 2011.

External links 
 

Television channels in South Korea
Mass media companies of South Korea
Television channels and stations established in 2006